Yusuf Sağ (born 1934 in İdil, Şırnak, Turkey) is the Syriac Catholic chorbishop, who served as the Patriarchal Exarch of the Syriac Catholic Patriarchal Exarchate of Turkey since 1991 until his retirement on 2 July 2017.

Life
After primary studies, Yusuf Sağ studied philosophy and theology in Beirut 
and received his ordination to the priesthood on 14 February 1964. He was pastor from 1964 to 1970 in Mardin and Diyarbakir, a NATO base.

In 1985 he was appointed patriarchal vicar and in 1987 he was appointed chorbishop, a priest with episcopal dignity.

In 1991 Sağ was appointed patriarchal exarch in Turkey.

Titles as clergyman
Yusuf Sağ was Syriac Catholic Patriarchal Exarchate of Turkey, based in Istanbul, previously Mardin. He was a member of the Turkish Catholic Bishops' Conference as a representative of the unified Syriac Catholic Church and president of the Commission for Interreligious Dialogue.
Yusuf Sağ to time was the only Turkish cleric of the Catholic Church in Turkey.

References

1934 births
Living people
Turkish Eastern Catholic priests
Syriac Catholic clergy
Turkish people of Assyrian descent
People from Şırnak Province
Eastern Catholic bishops in Turkey